The Honda XRM is an underbone-style motorbike that is produced and sold in the Philippines, and since 2021, in New Zealand as a non-street legal farm bike.  A non-off road model was also sold in Thailand as the Honda Nice. Launched in 2001, the Honda XRM was originally released with a  engine, but was later changed to a  engine taken from the Honda Wave. It is designed for both on- and off-road use.

Ease of modification and readily available parts and accessories have made the Honda XRM popular, particularly with the underbone riding culture, with numerous rider clubs being formed across the country. These modifications (especially to the handlebars and wheels) can pose danger, as they are not included in the product's engineering, and often defeat the "dual-sport" nature of the motorbike.

The Honda Bravo is a derivative of the Honda XRM designed for city use, but it carries the same frame that is used by NF100 (Wave100 - both models) not the frame of the XRM.

Gallery

References

External links
Honda Philippines XRM Webpage

XRM
Motorcycles of the Philippines
Motorcycles introduced in 2001